Turtle Gut Inlet was an inlet located in what is now Wildwood Crest, in Cape May County, New Jersey, United States.

Geography
Turtle Gut Inlet separated Five Mile Beach from Two Mile Beach, both of which are now connected.  The inlet was approximately located at the site of Diamond Beach in Lower Township, which is partially on Two Mile Beach and partially on land reclaimed as a result of the closure of Turtle Gut Inlet.

History
Turtle Gut Inlet is labeled as Turtle Inlet on a 1706 map by John Thornton, and as Turtle Gutt on a map published in 1749 by Lewis Evans.

In June 1776, the naval Battle of Turtle Gut Inlet was fought in the inlet and in the adjacent Atlantic Ocean. This was the only battle of the American Revolutionary War to be fought in Cape May County.

Turtle Gut Inlet was described in 1834 as,

Turtle Gut Inlet was described in 1878, viz.,

The closing of Turtle Gut Inlet in 1922 has made Two Mile Beach continuous with Five Mile Beach. Sunset Lake is a remnant of Turtle Gut Inlet.

See also 
Five Mile Beach
Two Mile Beach
Battle of Turtle Gut Inlet

References 

Wildwood Crest, New Jersey
Inlets of New Jersey
Bodies of water of Cape May County, New Jersey